The Return of the Durango Kid is a 1945 American Western film directed by Derwin Abrahams and written by J. Benton Cheney. The film stars Charles Starrett, Tex Harding, Jean Stevens and John Calvert. The film was released on April 19, 1945, by Columbia Pictures.

Plot

Cast          
Charles Starrett as Bill Blayden / The Durango Kid
Tex Harding as Jim
Jean Stevens as Paradise Flo
John Calvert as Leland Kirby
Betty Roadman as Buckskin Liz
Hal Price as Tom Wagner
Dick Botiller as Sheriff Potter
Britt Wood as Curly
Ray Bennett as Cherokee
Paul Conrad as Ringo
Steve Clark as Steve Manning
Carl Sepulveda as Tom Richards
Elmo Lincoln as Luke Blake

References

External links
 

1945 films
American Western (genre) films
1945 Western (genre) films
Columbia Pictures films
Films directed by Derwin Abrahams
American black-and-white films
1940s English-language films
1940s American films